These are the list of programs produced and/or distributed by the Philippine Broadcasting Service thru its radio networks: Radyo Pilipinas, Radyo Pilipinas Dos, Radyo Pilipinas Worldwide, FM1 and FM2.

Radyo Pilipinas
Note: Not all programs that are broadcast nationwide via satellite from its Manila station.

 Radyo Pilipinas News Nationwide (2017–present)
 Radyo Pilipinas Network Balita Ngayon (2017–present, hourly news update)
 Radyo Pilipinas Express Balita (2017–present, mid-hourly news update)
 Ronda Pilipinas
 Radyo Pilipinas Live (2022–present)
 Mike Abe Live (2022–present, also simulcast on PTV and IBC)
 Mark In, Mark Out (2022–present)
 Public Briefing: #LagingHandaPH (2022–present, hookup from PTV and IBC)
 Malacañang Press Briefing (hookup from PTV and IBC)
 Doctor On Board (2018–present)
 Serbisyo Pilipinas (2020–present)
 Operation Lokal (2017–present)
 Agenda ng Bayan (2016–present)
 Otro Cinco (2022–present)
 Sentro Balita (2020, 2022–present, hookup from PTV)
 Ulat Bayan (2017–present, hookup from PTV)
 Ulat Bayan Weekend (2017, 2020–present, hookup from PTV)
 Salaam Radio (2017–present)
 Mabuhay Pilipinas (2017–present)
 Go Agri (2022–present)
 Meet the Press On Air (2017–present)
 Celebrating Life (2017–present)
 PBS News Now (2023–present)
 Regional Roundup (2019–present)
 Philippine Sports Update (2023–present, hookup from RP2)
 Sports News Roundup (2022–present)
 Kanan, Kanan Lang! (2023–present)
 Home EcoNanay (2022–present)
 Usap-Usapan (2016–2017, 2022–present)
 AT: Adulting in Tandem (2023–present)
 Global Pinoy Konek (2023–present)
 Music and News (2023–present)
 Para sa Masa (2023–present)
 Usaping Legal (2023–present)
 Pulso ng Pilipino (2023–present)
 Inside Malacañang (2023–present)
 Kalinga Hatid ng Red Cross (2017–present)

Radyo Pilipinas Dos
 Ronda Pilipinas (hookup from RP1)
 Radyo Pilipinas News Nationwide (2017–present, hookup from RP1)
 Mabuhay Pilipinas (2017–present, hookup from RP1)
 Headlines Ngayon (hourly news update)
 Sports News Roundup (2017–present)
 Sports 918 (2017–present)
 Headline Sports (2022–present)
 Game On: Isyu at Balita (2017–present)

 Talk NBA (2017–present)
 Post Game (2017–present)
 Philippine Sports Update (2022–present)
 Football Connection (2019–present)
 Fight News Weekly (2022–present)
 Sports and Science (2018–present)
 Spiker's Net (2022–present)
 Isport Lang! (2018–present)
 Hoop Talk (2022–present)
 Top Sports Stories of the Week (2022–present)
 Chess and Billiards On Air (2022–present)
 Celebrating Life (2020–present, hookup from RP1)
 Cycle Lane (2022–present)
 Dancesport Pilipinas (2022–present)
 Sports Stars of Yesteryears (2022–present)
 Sports Calendar for the Week (2022–present)
 Sports Lockdown (2022–present)
 LGU Sports Corner (2022–present)
 Para-Games Hour (2022–present)
 Going Places (2023–present)
 PBA Games on RP2  (1983–1989, 2002, 2007–2008, 2011–2014, 2023–present) (simulcast also on selected RP1 stations)
 PBS News Now (2023–present)
 Press Start Pilipinas (2022–present)
 Tinig ng Kababaihan (2023–present)

Radyo Pilipinas Worldwide

Filipino Service
 Ang Pilipinas Ngayon
 PSA Census Serbilis Balita
 Usapang Barangay
 ASEAN Song
 Bakasyon Pilipinas
 Doctor on Board
 Usap-Usapan
 Kwento ng Buhay at Tagumpay
 From Philippines with Love

English Service
 Philippines city
 Dateline Malacañang
 DFA Online
 It's More Fun in the Philippines
 Philippine Trivia
 Music From the Region
 PNA Newsroom (2017–2022)

Streaming-only
 Tunog Pinoy
 Radyo Pilipinas hookup

Republ1ka FM1
 News You Can Use (hourly news bulletin)
 Weekend Recovery Radio
 Sunday Slaps
 Segments:
 Fresh 1
 Juan on 1
 PBS News Now (2023–present)

Capital FM2
 News You Can Use (hourly news bulletin)
 BBC World Service News (international news bulletin)
 Capital Drive
 Decompression Session
 Dance Republic
 Rhythm N' Booze
 Freeway Friday
 WAR: Weekend All Requests
 Master Class
 PBS News Now (2023–present)

Previously aired programming

Radyo ng Bayan/Radyo Pilipinas One
 News @ 1 (2012–2016)
 News @ 6 (2012–2016)
 Radyo ng Bayan Network Balita
 PBS Mid-Hour News
 One Morning Cafe (2007–2010)
 RadyoBisyon (2014–2017)
 PTV News (1995–1998, 2016–2017, 2017–2020)
 Maunlad na Agrikultura
 Radyo Peryodiko
 Jamon Bendijo
 Balita at Panayam
 Patrol ng Bayan
 Konek Tayo
 Barangay PBS
 Kaagapay ng Bayan
 Punto Perfecto
 Education Actionline
 Serbisyo Publiko
 Bayan at Kongreso
 Paaralan ng Bayan
 Balitaan at Kuwentuhan
 Sulong Kaibigan
 Bayani ng Lahi
 ABAKADA: Daan ng Buhay
 Ekslusibo sa 738
 Pilipinas, Pilipinas
 Buklod Bayan
 Musical Sunday (hookup from DWBR)
 Mornings with M
 Beautiful Sunday
 Daang Walang Hanggan
 Highway of Information
 Go Green Bayan
 Online Balita (2016–2017)
 Radyo Pilipinas News Today (2017–2018)
 PCSO Lottery Draw
 Digong Diaries Special (DDS) Podcast (hookup from Radio-Television Malacanañg)
 Isumbong Mo Kay Tulfo
 Healthmax (2018–2020)
 Bale Todo (2016–2018)
 Radyo Journalismo
 Bitag Live (2017–2022)
 Atraksyon Integrasyon
 Network Briefing News (2020–2022)
 Tutok Erwin Tulfo (2018–2022)
 i-ARTA Na 'Yan! (2022)
 Tutok PDEA, Kontra Droga (2020–2022)
 Tropang Bistag (2017–2022)
 FOI sa Radyo
 Cabinet Report (2018–2022)
 Youth for Truth (2019–2022)
 Education Radio (2018–2019)
 CORDS X Podcast
 Gearbox (2018–2020)
 Hi-Tech Pilipinas
 DOSTv sa Radyo
 Magsasaka sa Radyo
 Balik Probinsya, Bagong Pag-asa Program (2022)
 Kasindak-sindak (2017–2020)
 Kita ay Kita
 Usaping Legal
 Kaibigan sa Kalusugan
 Birada Bendijo (2020)
 Kalinga Hatid ng Red Cross (2020–2022)
 Pulso ng Bayan (2020–2022)
 Pangga Ruth Abao, Live!
 Ugat Pilipino
 Kita Mo Na? (Galing ng Pinoy!)
 Usapang K (2021–2022)
 Bangon, Bayang Mahal! (2022)
 Bantay Kalsada
 Census Serbilis sa Radyo (2017–2023)

Sports Radio/Radyo Pilipinas Dos
 PBS Network News
 PTV Sports
 Sports Chat
 SR Time-Out
 Sports, Isyu, Balita
 The Scene Around
 PSA Radio Forum
 POC/PSC Radio Forum
 Chess Scholastics
 Racing Talk
 Word from Our Sponsor
 Sounds of Sports
 Dream Date
 BBC Sport
 Boxing K-N-B
 Youth Service
 Ang Atleta
 Mid-Evening with The Beatles (2017–2020)
 PCSO Lottery Draw
 PNA Newsroom (2017–2018)
 Target On Air (2019–2020)
 PSA Forum (2022)
 Saturday Jam
 Athletes' Corner (2022)
 Sports Eye (2018–2022)
 PSC Hour (2023)
 Get Back with The Beatles (2022)
 Motorsports Paddock (2019–2023)
 Sports Jam (2022)

Radyo Magasin/Radyo Pilipinas Dos
 Balita at Panayam (2016–2017)
 Gabay at Balita
 Hatid Sundo
 Musta Ka Mare
 Lakbay Radyo, Bakasyon Pilipinas
 Afternoon Delight
 Youthtalks
 OPM Tayo
 Tipanan kay Ate Pining
 Himig Natin
 Say Mo, Say Ko
 Bonggang Morning
 Filipinas, Ahora Mismo (2007–2009)
 The Buzz Magazine (2017–2018)
 Boses ng Sambayanan (2017)
 Radio and Music
 FHM with Yami
 Power to Unite
 Chikahan
 Sabado at si Antonio
 Sitsirya
 Letters and Souvenirs
 Sama-Sama, Salo-Salo
 Sunday Memory Lane
 The Lady Love
 Bonggang Sunday
 May Nagmamasid
 Radyo Taliba (2017–2018)
 Radyo Tabloid (2018–2020)
 Home EcoNanay (2017–2020)
 Hype na Buhay 'To! (2018–2020)
 Serbisyo Pilipinas (2018–2020)
 Pulso ng Sambayanan (2017–2019)
 P.L.A.K.A. (2017–2020)
 Making Good (2017–2020)
 PWD Phil Hour (2017–2019)
 Buhay Pamilya (2017–2020)
 Titos sa Tanghali (2017–2020)
 Diretsahan (2019–2020)
 Palaban (2018–2020)
 The Elvis Presley Show (2017–2020)
 Harana ng Puso (2017–2020)

Business Radio
 PBS Network News
 Fresh with George Boone
 Morning Grooves
 Executive Coach
 Business Brew
 Metro Rhythms
 Insurance for All
 President in Focus
 Healthcare Plus
 Music Cafe
 Make My Day with Larry Henares (also aired on UNTV-37)
 Sports Chat
 Mornings with M
 Pop Symphony
 Movie Melodies
 The Law of the Heart is Love
 Kundiman Specials
 Broadcasters Bureau
 Kahapon Lamang

FM1
 The Morning Ma-jiggy
 Morning Mishmash
 Music Mission
 Joyride
 FM1 for the Road
 FM1 Super Five
 Pajamawhamma
 Sprack Attack
 FM1 Weekly Top 30
 Boom-Boom Bastic
 Sunday Y2K
 SlowMo
 Republ1ka Weekly Top 30

FM2
 Friday 24K
 Friday Y2K
 Steady Sunday
 Hometown Heroes

See also
Philippine Broadcasting Service
Radyo Pilipinas
Radyo Pilipinas Dos
Radyo Pilipinas Worldwide

References

Philippine radio programs
Philippine Broadcasting Service